Tomasz Lisowicz (born 23 February 1977 in Kalisz) is a Polish former racing cyclist.

Major results

2000
3rd Overall Szlakiem Grodów Piastowskich
2002
1st Coupe des Carpathes
2003
 1st  Time trial, National Road Championships
2004
3rd Overall Malopolski Wyscig Gorski
3rd Memoriał Henryka Łasaka
2006
1st Szlakiem Walk Majora Hubala
3rd Neuseen Classics-Rund um die Braunkohle
2007
1st Memoriał Andrzeja Trochanowskiego
2009
3rd Puchar Ministra Obrony Narodowej

References

1977 births
Living people
Polish male cyclists
Sportspeople from Kalisz
21st-century Polish people